Khana Khud Garam Karo, also known as Apna Khana Khud Garam Karo, is a 2018 Pakistani drama television film produced and directed by Kashif Saleem and written by Faiza Iftikhar. The telefilm stars Nadia Khan, Aiman Khan and Affan Waheed in pivotal roles. Telefilm premiered on 18 June 2018 (Eid-ul-Fitr) by ARY Digital. Its title is inspired by a banner from the "Aurat March" being held in Pakistan during Women's day 2018.

Cast
Aiman Khan as Rumana: Conservative and traditional women who slowly changed after meeting with Jameela, her new neighbour
Nadia Khan as Jameela: Dominating wife of Khalid, she and her husband rents a new house near Manzar and Romana's house
Affan Waheed as Manzar: Romana's husband
Saleem Mairaj as Khalid: Jameela's husband
Aniya Khan as Jameela's maid

Production
Nadia Khan played antagonist for the first time in her career. Talking about the plot and her character, Nadia revealed to DAWN, "It's the story of a newly-wed couple and their crazy neighbour, played by me".

References

External links
Official website

Pakistani television films
2018 films
2018 drama films